The 2023 Supercopa Uruguaya was the sixth edition of the Supercopa Uruguaya, Uruguay's football super cup. It was held on 29 January 2023 between the 2022 Primera División champions Nacional and the 2022 Torneo Intermedio runners-up Liverpool at Estadio Centenario in Montevideo.

Liverpool were the winners, beating Nacional 1–0 to claim their second Supercopa Uruguaya title.

Teams
The Supercopa Uruguaya is usually contested by the champions of the Primera División and the Torneo Intermedio winners of the previous year, however since Nacional won both tournaments, their rival for the match were the Torneo Intermedio runners-up Liverpool.

Both teams previously faced each other in a Supercopa Uruguaya match in 2020, in which Liverpool won the title with a 4–2 win after extra time.

Details

References

2023 in Uruguayan football
Supercopa Uruguaya
Supercopa Uruguaya 2022